Le Québécois Libre (or QL) was an online libertarian magazine, or webzine published in Quebec, Canada. The QL, owned and published by Martin Masse since February 1998, portrayed a classical liberal point of view on numerous topics, particularly related to current affairs in Quebec, or, to a lesser extent, France and the United States.

The principal language of the magazine was French, but a quarter of the articles were written in English. Le Québécois Libre accommodated all liberal views including minarchism and anarcho-capitalism.

Articles have been featured on National Post and C2C journals.

The name Le Québécois Libre is a pun on "Québec Libre", a nationalist slogan, as the magazine aimed to promote the freedom of those living in Quebec rather than the nationalist aim of promoting the state.

It featured articles by Martin Masse, Ron Paul, Scott Reid and Pascal Salin, among others. In 2016 the magazine ceased publication.

References

External links
 Official website 
 Official blog 

1998 establishments in Quebec
2016 disestablishments in Quebec
Online magazines published in Canada
Defunct magazines published in Canada
French-language magazines published in Canada
Libertarian publications
Libertarianism in Canada
Magazines established in 1998
Magazines disestablished in 2016
Magazines published in Montreal
Quebec websites